When the Bells Sound Clearly (German: Wenn die Glocken hell erklingen) is a 1959 Austrian comedy drama film directed by Eduard von Borsody and starring Willy Birgel, Ellen Schwiers and Teddy Reno.

The film's sets were designed by the art director Hans Zehetner.

Cast
 Willy Birgel as Graf von Warthenberg 
 Ellen Schwiers as Susanne Weiden 
 Teddy Reno as Singer 
 Michael Ande as Michael 
 Annie Rosar as Alma 
 Loni von Friedl as Hanna 
 Senta Wengraf as Maria 
 Rudolf Carl as Der Polizist 
 Hermann Thimig as Dr. Mersmann 
 Lola Urban-Kneidinger as Frau Roesner 
 Alfred Costas as Maxi 
 Paul Horn as Bürgermeister 
 Wiener Sängerknaben as Sängerknaben

References

Bibliography 
 Bergfelder, Tim & Bock, Hans-Michael. The Concise Cinegraph: Encyclopedia of German. Berghahn Books, 2009.

External links 
 

1959 films
Austrian comedy-drama films
1959 comedy-drama films
1950s German-language films
Films directed by Eduard von Borsody
1959 comedy films
1959 drama films